StFX Stadium, formerly known as Oland Stadium, is the home field of the St. Francis Xavier University varsity athletics programs in Antigonish, Nova Scotia.  It is the home of X-Men football, X-Women rugby, X-Men and X-Women soccer, cross country, track & field teams, numerous club teams, intramural participants, recreational users, and community groups.

The stadium features artificial field turf (installed in 2009), with field lines for football, rugby, soccer, and lacrosse, along with an eight-lane 400m rubberized track. There is bleacher and individual seating for 1,100, stadium lighting, and perimeter fencing.

References 

 http://www.goxgo.ca
 http://www.atlanticuniversitysport.com/sports/fball/index
 http://english.cis-sic.ca/sports/fball/2013-14/teams?sort=toppg&r=0&pos=mis

 University sports venues in Canada
 St. Francis Xavier University
Canadian football venues